Abdelaziz al-Tebbaa or Sidi Abdelaziz ibn Abdelhaq Tebbaa al-Hassani (died 1508) was the founder of the first sufi zawiyya of the Jazuli order in Marrakesh. The principles of Sidi al-Tebbaa ultimately go back to  Abu Madyan, as outlined in Abu Madyan's book Bidayat al-murid (Basic principles of the Sufi path), a compilation by  Abu Mohammed Salih al-Majiri (d.631/1216). Al-Tebaa frequently travelled to Fez, where he gave lectures on Sufism and led recitations of Dala'il al-Khayrat at the al-Attarin madrasa. In Fez, he also initiated Sidi Ali Salih al-Andalusi (d. 903/1488), a refugee from Granada and author of Sharh rahbat al-aman, who founded the second zawiya of the Jazouliya in Fez. At-Tebbaa is also well known as one of the Sabatu Rijal, the seven saints of Marrakesh. His tomb is visited by many pilgrims throughout the year. He was succeeded by Sidi al-Ghazwani.

See also 

 Zawiya of Sidi Abd el-Aziz

References 

Moroccan Sufis
Year of birth unknown
1499 deaths
People from Marrakesh
15th-century Moroccan people